Paymaster Rear-Admiral Sir John Henry George Chapple, KCB, CVO (4 December 1859 – 5 March 1925) was a Royal Navy officer and courtier. He was the Royal Navy's first Paymaster Director-General, as well as the first paymaster to (retroactively) reach flag rank.

References 

1859 births
1925 deaths
Royal Navy admirals
Royal Navy admirals of World War I
Royal Navy logistics officers
Members of the British Royal Household
Knights Commander of the Order of the Bath
Commanders of the Royal Victorian Order
Royal Navy personnel of the Anglo-Zulu War
Royal Navy personnel of the Anglo-Egyptian War